Scott Frickel is an American sociologist, currently an associate professor at Brown University, previously a professor at Tulane University and Washington State University, where he was the Boeing Distinguished Professor of Environmental Sociology. He is also a published author, being both cited and collected by libraries.

References 

Living people
Brown University faculty
American sociologists
Tulane University faculty
Washington State University faculty
Year of birth missing (living people)
Place of birth missing (living people)
Environmental sociologists